Palaeospheniscus is an extinct genus of penguins belonging to the subfamily Palaeospheniscinae. These penguins are apparently not closely related to the modern genus Spheniscus.

Description
The species of Palaeospheniscus were medium-sized to largish penguins, ranging from P. gracilis with an estimated maximal length of 55 cm to P. wimani, which reached up to 73 cm.

Species
This genus contains the following three species:
Palaeospheniscus patagonicus (type)
Palaeospheniscus bergi
Palaeospheniscus biloculatus

The following other species are disputed:
Palaeospheniscus wimani (disputed)
Palaeospheniscus gracilis (disputed)

They are all (except P. bergi, which is somewhat enigmatic) known from one or two handful of bones. Most of the specimens were found in Santa Cruz and Chubut Provinces of Patagonia, Argentina. The fossils were recovered from the Patagonian Molasse Formation, and are probably Early Miocene to Late Miocene or possibly Early Pliocene in age (Stucchi et al. 2003).

The type species of this genus is Palaeospheniscus patagonicus, the Patagonian slender-footed penguin. Palaeospheniscus gracilis was long believed to be from the Early Oligocene, but this is now thought to be erroneous.

Distribution
Specimen belonging to this genus have been found in the Pliocene of South Africa, in Miocene to Pliocene of Chile, in Miocene of Argentina and South Africa and in Oligocene to Miocene of Argentina and Peru.

References
 Moreno, Francisco & Mercerat, A. (1891): Catálogo de los pájaros fósiles de la República Argentina conservados en el Museo de La Plata. Anales del Museo de La Plata 1: 7-71, 21 plates.
 Simpson, George Gaylord (1972): Conspectus of Patagonian fossil penguins. American Museum Novitates 2488: 1-37. PDF fulltext
 Stucchi, Marcelo; Urbina, Mario & Giraldo, Alfredo (2003): Una nueva especie de Spheniscidae del Mioceno Tardío de la Formación Pisco, Perú. Bulletin Institut Français d'Études Andines 32(2): 361–375. PDF fulltext

External links

 
Pliocene birds of South America
Bird genera
Miocene birds of South America
Extinct penguins
Fossil taxa described in 1891
Pliocene Africa
Miocene Africa
Miocene Chile
Pliocene Chile
Miocene Argentina
Oligocene Argentina
Oligocene Peru